In geometry, the snub hexaoctagonal tiling is a semiregular tiling of the hyperbolic plane. There are three triangles, one hexagon, and one octagon on each vertex.  It has Schläfli symbol of sr{8,6}.

Images 
Drawn in chiral pairs, with edges missing between black triangles:

Related polyhedra and tilings 

From a Wythoff construction there are fourteen hyperbolic uniform tilings that can be based from the regular order-6 octagonal tiling. 

Drawing the tiles colored as red on the original faces, yellow at the original vertices, and blue along the original edges, there are 7 forms with full [8,6] symmetry, and 7 with subsymmetry.

See also 
 Tilings of regular polygons
 List of uniform planar tilings

References
 John H. Conway, Heidi Burgiel, Chaim Goodman-Strass, The Symmetries of Things 2008,  (Chapter 19, The Hyperbolic Archimedean Tessellations)

External links 

 Hyperbolic and Spherical Tiling Gallery
 KaleidoTile 3: Educational software to create spherical, planar and hyperbolic tilings
 Hyperbolic Planar Tessellations, Don Hatch

Chiral figures
Hyperbolic tilings
Isogonal tilings
Semiregular tilings
Snub tilings